"I Love L.A." is a song by Randy Newman. It was originally released on his 1983 album Trouble in Paradise. The song is about Los Angeles, California, and its hook is its title, repeated, each time followed by an enthusiastic crowd cheering, "We love it!"

Writing and recording

Following the release of his sixth album Born Again (1979), Newman heavily procrastinated writing songs for a follow-up album, and spent a good portion of the next four years relaxing at home with his family. Newman jokingly noted that because he often lounged by the pool, the gardener had to water around him. To counter this lackadaisical lifestyle, Newman rented a recording studio in Los Angeles in 1983, which did not have any telephones to distract him. In this studio Newman recorded a song called "Something to Sing About", in which the narrator arrogantly boasts about the suburban opulence around him. Album producer Lenny Waronker disliked "Something to Sing About" and opted not to include it on the singer's upcoming album.

Although "Something to Sing About" was not used, the song's message of delusion and arrogance served as an inspiration for "I Love L.A." Another source of inspiration came from a conversation Newman had with Eagles drummer Don Henley while on an airplane. Henley told him that he could no longer afford to charter Learjets, to which Newman sarcastically responded: "Jesus that's tough...you can't live on a million a year anymore". During the same flight, Henley suggested Newman should write a song about Los Angeles, as he was a native of the city. This conversation, as well as "Something to Sing About", not only served as the inspiration for "I Love L.A.", but also the themes of hedonism and disillusion found in the song's parent album Trouble in Paradise.

"I Love L.A." and the rest of the songs from Trouble in Paradise were recorded at Warner Bros. Recording Studios in Hollywood, with producers Waronker and Russ Titelman. Mark Linett served as the audio and mixing engineer, while Bobby Hata was the audio master. Several members of the rock band Toto provided groove instrumentation, and Waddy Wachtel played the rhythm guitar.

Composition
AllMusic's Matthew Greenwald believes "I Love L.A." is Newman's only attempt at writing an "anthem", as the song features an energetic and buoyant melody not commonly found in the singer's previous music. "I Love L.A." begins with a soft opening verse, which features electric piano and saxophone instrumentation. The opening verse borrows the melody of Rodgers and Hart's 1937 song "The Lady Is a Tramp". Newman begins this verse by deriding New York City as a place where "people dressed like monkeys", and saying Chicago should be left to the "Eskimos". The soft verse then transitions to a more upbeat, pop rock driven melody, influenced by the sound of the Beach Boys. This influence is evidenced when Newman name-drops the band in the lyrics, as well as alluding to their 1963 song "Surfin' U.S.A."

Following the musical shift, the lyrics now depict Newman driving down Imperial Highway in Los Angeles with a "big nasty redhead" at his side. Newman sings about rolling down the windows and pulling back the top of his convertible as he feels the Santa Ana winds brush against him. He proceeds to name-drop several regions in Los Angeles such as South Bay, the Valley, and the Westside, and how everyone in these regions are happy because the sun is shining. The chorus features Newman singing the phrase "I love L.A." several times, while Christine McVie and Lindsey Buckingham of the band Fleetwood Mac respond each time with "We love it".

After the first chorus, the music temporarily shifts to a new section that removes the guitar and heavily emphasizes the synthesizer, before returning to its original melody. Newman proceeds to point out various objects and people, such as Matterhorn Bobsleds, palm trees, homeless people, and beautiful California women. Newman then name-drops several famous streets in Los Angeles: Century Boulevard, Victory Boulevard, Santa Monica Boulevard, and the Sixth Street Viaduct. Each time he says the name of a road, McVie and Buckingham respond with the phrase "We love it". A guitar solo (played by Toto's Steve Lukather) follows, before the song ends with the chorus.

Lyrical analysis
Newman is well known for his sardonic lyrics, as he would often write a song from a character's perspective and mock the first-person character and others like them. This style of songwriting can be seen in some of Newman's other songs, such as the slaver perspective in "Sail Away" (1972), and the redneck perspective in "Rednecks" (1974). Despite its lively sound, "I Love L.A." also includes these sardonic lyrics, specifically about the shallow and dark aspects of Los Angeles. When Newman is listing off various sites in Los Angeles, Newman is discussing how residents will talk about the lavish excess of the city (palm trees, beautiful women) in an attempt to hide the squalor (a homeless man begging for money).

Nicholas Pell of LA Weekly noted how there were other parts of the song that serve as subtle insults to the city. He noted the Santa Ana winds in reality are very unpleasant, as the strong winds blow palm leaves and furniture around, and often bring hot dry weather. Pell believes the four streets listed at the end of the song were the four "must avoid" streets of 1983, due to gang violence and urban neglect. Pell ultimately described "I Love L.A." as a "paean to the moral weakness and intellectual vapidity" of Los Angeles. When journalist Timothy White asked whether or not "I Love L.A." was written as an insult to Los Angeles, Newman responded by saying he felt the lyrics were ambiguous. In a separate interview, Newman confessed an affection for his native city despite its imperfections: "There's some kind of ignorance L.A. has that I'm proud of. The open car and the redhead, the Beach Boys... that sounds really good to me."

Release and reception
"I Love L.A." was released in 1983 as the lead single from Trouble in Paradise. At first, the single was considered a flop, as it failed to make the Billboard Hot 100, and was not distributed to retailers outside of the West Coast of the United States. The song did, however, reach #110 on Billboard Bubbling Under chart during April 1983.

The following year, Los Angeles hosted the Summer Olympics, and the company Nike ran an ambush marketing campaign during the event. The campaign included a commercial featuring Newman singing "I Love L.A." while Olympic athletes Mary Decker and Carl Lewis ran and jumped wearing Nike gear. The commercial played throughout the Olympics, and as a result, "I Love L.A." received worldwide exposure. It became one of the best-selling songs in Los Angeles, as citizens of Los Angeles saw the song as a celebration of their city.

Credits and personnel
Credits adapted from the liner notes of Trouble in Paradise.

Musicians
 Randy Newman – vocals, piano, synthesizer, arranger, conductor
 Steve Lukather – lead guitar
 Larry Williams – saxophone
 David Paich – Fender Rhodes, Farfisa organ 
 Michael Boddicker – synthesizer  
 Nathan East – bass
 Jeff Porcaro – drums
 Christine McVie – background vocals
 Lindsey Buckingham – background vocals
 Waddy Wachtel – rhythm guitar

Production
 Russ Titelman, Lenny Waronker – producers
 Mark Linett – audio engineering
 Mark Linett – mixing
 Bobby Hata – mastering

Covers and parodies
 Alvin and the Chipmunks covered the song for their TV series episode, "I Love L.A."
 In 1998, the rock group Jake Trout and the Flounders – consisting of professional golfers Payne Stewart, Peter Jacobsen and Larry Rinker – recorded a golf-themed parody of the song titled "I Love to Play", for their album of the same name.
 In 1985, Kris Kardashian (now Kris Jenner) covered the song with her own spin titled "I Love My Friends". Her daughters recreated the video for her 60th birthday in 2015.
 The song is sampled in "We Run L.A." by Dr. Hollywood.
 La Habra, California mayor Jim Gomez did a parody video to the tune of "I love L.H." The video featured Octomom, and the video was quickly removed from the Internet after negative comments from many community leaders.
 The song was covered by Matthew Morrison, Kevin McHale, Darren Criss, Jacob Artist, and Chord Overstreet (as their characters Will Schuester, Artie Abrams, Blaine Anderson, Jake Puckerman, and Sam Evans, respectively) on the FOX television series Glee, in the season five episode "City of Angels".
 The song's many parodies include: "I Love D.C." (Washington, D.C.), "I Love D.M." (Des Moines, Iowa), "I Love Padres" (San Diego Padres), "I Love Elway" (John Elway), "I Hate L.A." (Underground Comedy Movie) "I Love SU" (Syracuse University), "I Love VR" (Fangamer)
 In the film Run Ronnie Run the song "I Loathe L.A." is heard on the radio performed by Daffy Mal Yinkleyankle (Bob Odenkirk)

In popular culture
"I Love L.A." has been used in the following feature films:

Down and Out in Beverly Hills (1986)
The Naked Gun: From the Files of Police Squad! (1988)
The Citizens Of Los Angeles (1993)
Escape from L.A. (1996)
Bean (1997)
Volcano (1997)
CHiPs '99 (1998)
The Lovely Bones (2009)

"I Love L.A." was the first (and the last) music video aired on Cable Music Channel. The song was also used in some of the network's IDs and commercial promos.

A modified version of the song was used as part of the "You'll Love It!" 1985–86 TV season image campaign for ABC.

"I Love L.A." is played following major sporting events in Los Angeles if the home team has scored or won, notably when the Los Angeles Dodgers, Los Angeles Lakers, Los Angeles Rams, Los Angeles Kings and the Los Angeles Galaxy win, with it being the Kings' former goal song. The Dodgers adapted the title to "We Love L.A." as a marketing slogan for the 2015 season, prompting Los Angeles Times writer Steve Dilbeck to quip, "It's not 'I Love L.A.' like in the song, but we love L.A. Guess they wanted to save paying royalties to Randy Newman."

In the 1985 movie Gotcha!, Anthony Edwards plays an American teenager, fugitive in Europe, who bonds with a German punk rock band after they discover he's from Los Angeles, as they are fans of Randy Newman's song, and they subsequently agree to smuggle him to safety.

The song was one of many California related songs played throughout "Sunshine Plaza" in the original Disney California Adventure.

In 2001, the XFL's Los Angeles Xtreme would play the song after they scored a touchdown, as well as when they won a home game.

During the 2008 National League Division Series and 2008 National League Championship Series, TBS or Fox Network would play the song at the end of any half-inning where the Dodgers produced a run. It was also played over speakers when the Lakers arrived at Los Angeles Memorial Coliseum following their 2009 NBA Championship parade and the winning of the second of their back-to-back titles when the Lakers beat the Celtics in Game 7.

The sequence of streets in the song was parodied in the 1985 song "Born in East L.A." by Cheech Marin. But instead of listing the streets sung by Randy Newman, listed are Soto Street, Brooklyn Avenue, City Terrace, and Whittier Boulevard, all streets of East Los Angeles.

The song is referred to in the Bret Easton Ellis novel Less than Zero, when the main character laments about the "bum on his knees" in a song about L.A.

In June 2014, as part of losing a bet on the National Hockey League finals between the New York Rangers and the Los Angeles Kings with Los Angeles mayor Eric Garcetti, New York City mayor Bill de Blasio sang the song on Jimmy Kimmel Live!, wearing an "I Love L.A." T-shirt and accompanied by disadvantaged youth from the 52nd Street Project.

For many years the "I Love L.A." music video was played as the nightly sign-off for the Los Angeles PBS station, KCET.

On October 11, 2020, the song was featured on Family Guy Season 19 Episode 3, titled Boys & Squirrels.  The song was chosen by Chris and Stewie Griffin to play in the background of a video clip they took of their rescued squirrel taking its first steps, just before its tragic death.

The song was played after the Lakers won the 2020 NBA Finals at the ESPN Wide World of Sports Complex at the Walt Disney World complex in Bay Lake, Florida, where the 2020 NBA Playoffs were held due to the COVID-19 pandemic.  Only sixteen days later, the song was played after the Dodgers won the 2020 World Series at Globe Life Field in Arlington, Texas, where the entire World Series was played due to the COVID-19 pandemic.

Following the Rams' victory in Super Bowl LVI on February 13, 2022, the song was played at SoFi Stadium and the subsequent parade at Exposition Park.

See also

 "Theme from New York, New York" by Frank Sinatra
 "I Love New York"
 "I Left My Heart in San Francisco" by Tony Bennett
 "Viva Las Vegas" by Elvis Presley
 "Sweet Home Chicago"

References

1983 singles
Culture of Los Angeles
Randy Newman songs
Songs about Los Angeles
Songs written by Randy Newman
1983 songs
Warner Records singles
Los Angeles Dodgers